Jon George Rokne from the University of Calgary, Calgary, AB, Canada was named Fellow of the Institute of Electrical and Electronics Engineers (IEEE) in 2013 "for contributions to computer graphics and geographic information systems".

References 

Fellow Members of the IEEE
Living people
Year of birth missing (living people)

Bibliography 
Alhajj, R., & Rokne, J. Encyclopedia of social network analysis and mining. New York: Springer, 2014.